Carter Paterson (CP) was a British road haulage firm, closely associated with the railway industry.

History
It was founded in 1860, formed into a private company (Carter, Paterson & Co., Ltd.) in 1887, and converted into a public company in February 1934.  In October 1933, the Big Four railway companies purchased control of the company in equal shares.  Its head office was at 128 Goswell Road, London EC1.

Ownership passed on nationalisation to the British Transport Commission and CP was subsequently absorbed into British Road Services.

Popular media
The lovelorn batman to Clive Brook’s Major Daviot, Tandy, played by Gus McNaughton, compares their peripatetic lifestyle unfavourably to a career in Carter Paterson, in the 1937 film, Action for Slander.

References

Notes

Sources

Further reading
Hays Wharf Cartage Company (1947) Transport Saga, 1646 - 1947. London: Hays Wharf Cartage Company (a history of Pickford's Ltd and Carter Paterson & Co.)

1860 establishments in England
Transport companies based in London
Defunct shipping companies of the United Kingdom
Transport companies established in 1860
British companies established in 1860